The Guild of Loyal Women of South Africa was a voluntary organisation which identified, marked and maintained Second Boer War graves and military graveyards. A prominent founder member was the author and conservationist, Dorothea Fairbridge (1862–1931).

History
The Guild was founded in early 1900, and by June of that year had 3,000 members mainly in the Cape Colony. By the end of the year it had branches in Natal and there were plans for branches in the Free State and the Transvaal. Although the members considered themselves non-political (in the sense of local party politics) as the name suggests the movement attracted members from those loyal to the British Crown, and it received royal patronage in December 1900.  In 1901 it became affiliated with the Victoria League (now The Victoria League for Commonwealth Friendship).

Cultural references
To The South African Guild of Loyal Women is a poem about the organisation written by Cicely Fox Smith (1882–1954).

See also
Commonwealth War Graves Commission

Notes

References

 — first published:

Further reading

 — How the Guild helped relatives of an Australian soldier killed in the Boer War commemorate his death at his graveside 100 years later.

Defunct civic and political organisations in South Africa
Organizations established in 1900
Second Boer War